Czachów may refer to the following places:
Czachów, Masovian Voivodeship (east-central Poland)
Czachów, Świętokrzyskie Voivodeship (south-central Poland)
Czachów, West Pomeranian Voivodeship (north-west Poland)